Johnny Blake (born 17 November 1930) is a former Australian rules footballer who played with Carlton in the Victorian Football League (VFL).

Notes

External links 

Johnny Blake's profile at Blueseum

1930 births
Carlton Football Club players
Living people
Australian rules footballers from Victoria (Australia)